Wosikowski is a masculine Polish surname, its feminine counterpart is Wosikowska. Notable people with the surname include:

Alice Wosikowski (1886-1949), German politician
Irene Wosikowski (1910-1944), German political activist

See also 
 Wasikowski

Polish-language surnames